The 18th South African Parliament was the eighteenth Parliament of South Africa to convene since the unification of South Africa in 1910 and the sixth to convene since the adoption of the republican constitution in 1961. It was elected in the 1981 South African general election and consisted of the unicameral House of Assembly. The House of Assembly contained 165 members.

Three different parties were represented in this parliament; the National Party (NP), the Progressive Federal Party (PFP), and the New Republic Party (NRP). The majority party in the 17th parliament, the National Party retained its majority, although it was reduced to 131 seats, down from the 134 out of 165 seats it had in the previous parliament.

Summary by Province
The table below gives the number of registered voters (all of whom were classified as white under the apartheid legislation) and parliamentary seats, on the day of the election, broken down by Province. The provinces are those which existed prior to 1994.

Parties represented

House of Assembly

Members of Parliament
The first column is the name of the Electoral Division. The second is the province (abbreviated to CP, Nat, OFS and Tvl respectively). The third is the name of the MP. The fourth column is the MPs party.

MPs elected in the South African general election, 1981 for the 18th Parliament (1981–1987)

References
 South Africa 1982: Official Yearbook of the Republic of South Africa, (Chris van Rensburg Publications 198w)

18th South African parliament